The Princess Diaries, Volume IX: Princess Mia, released in the United Kingdom as The Princess Diaries: To The Nines, is a young adult book in the Princess Diaries series.  Written by Meg Cabot, it was released in the USA on December 26, 2007 by Harper Collins Publishers and is the ninth novel in the series.

Plot Summary
This volume begins almost immediately after the end of Princess Diaries, Volume VIII: Princess on the Brink. Mia Thermopolis has just sent a message to her ex-boyfriend Michael Moscovitz, apologizing for fighting with him, breaking up, and kissing another guy. To clear her mind, Mia decides to go to the theater with that guy, J.P., (her best friend Lilly's ex) to see Beauty and the Beast: The Musical. Unfortunately, a picture of the two of them together ends up on the cover of the New York Post, making Lilly even more upset about the kiss, and leading to the end of the girls' friendship. 

Mia has also been asked to give a speech for Domina Rei, a society of powerful women run by her arch enemy Lana Weinberger's mother. Of course Grand-mère is dying for Mia to give the speech, and potentially become a member since she herself was once blackballed from the organization.

To make matters even worse, Mia discovers someone has created a website called "www.ihatemiathermopolis.com" which lists things that are terrible about her/mocking lists. 

When Michael finally calls, he decides it is best that they stay "just friends". Unable to cope, Mia retreats to her room, begins binge-eating (mostly meat products which she used to not eat due to her vegetarianism), and refuses to go to school for four days.

Eventually, Mia's family steps in. Her father takes her to see a cowboy psychologist, Dr. Knutz, who convinces Mia to return to school and try to move on with her life. Mia at first does not agree with Dr. Knutz's assessment that she is suffering from depression, however begins to see that he may be right. 

Meanwhile, as Mia is preparing for her speech to the Domina Rei, she discovers an old ancestress; Princess Amelie, who ruled Genovia for twelve days while she was only sixteen, before dying of the bubonic plague. While reading Amelie's diary, Mia discovers a proclamation the young woman had written shortly before death allowing for open elections for a Genovian prime minister and reducing the monarchy to mere figureheads, like in England. Mia tells her father and Grand-mère who both advise her not to say anything about the document. 

Dr. Knutz helps Mia decide to reveal Princess Amelie's story to the Domina Rei in her speech; this brave act earns her an invitation to join, and an e-mail from Michael. On her way home, she finds J.P., who had earlier confessed he was in love with her. She kisses him and then finally replies to Michael's e-mail in a happy mood.

References
 Meg Cabot: Mail Bag, 15 November 2006.  URL accessed 25 April 2007.

2008 American novels
American young adult novels

The Princess Diaries novels
HarperCollins books